Sprifermin (INN) (developmental code name AS-902330), is a recombinant human fibroblast growth factor 18 (rhFGF18) analog, which is under development by Merck and Nordic Bioscience for the treatment of osteoarthritis. FGF18 and sprifermin are potent agonists of the FGFR2, FGFR3 and FGFR4. 

In 2020, Merck reported 5-year follow-up data from the Phase 2 clinical trial for knee osteoarthritis, which demonstrated that sprifermin was able to promote statistically significant improvement in cartilage thickness relative to control in a dose-dependent manner, meeting the primary endpoint of the study. Sprifermin was well tolerated with no severe adverse events associated with the treatment.  Long-term follow up showed that continual injections, up to 12 per year of bilateral treatment, may need to be sustained over a period of multiple years to prevent recurrence of cartilage loss.  Improvement in WOMAC, a secondary endpoint, was met for the Subgroup at Risk.

References

External links 
 Sprifermin - AdisInsight

Human proteins
Recombinant proteins